is a former Japanese football player.

Playing career
Kakimoto was born in Miyako, Fukuoka on October 6, 1977. After graduating from Osaka University of Health and Sport Sciences, he joined the J1 League club Avispa Fukuoka in 2000. He was not put into play in any matches and in 2001, he moved to Singapore and joined Clementi Khalsa. In 2002, he returned to Japan and joined the J2 League club Oita Trinita. Although the club was promoted to J1 in 2003, he did not play much over the next two seasons. In June 2003, he moved to the J2 club Shonan Bellmare. He became a regular player and scored many goals. In 2006, he moved to the J1 club Cerezo Osaka on loan. Although he played often as a substitute forward, he did not score any goals and the club was relegated to J2 at the end of the 2006 season. In 2007, he returned to Shonan Bellmare. However he still did not play often. In 2008, he moved to the Regional Leagues club Matsumoto Yamaga FC. He played as a regular player and scored many goals in the 2008 and 2009 seasons. The club was also promoted to the Japan Football League in 2010. He retired at the end of the 2010 season.

Club statistics

References

External links

1977 births
Living people
Osaka University of Health and Sport Sciences alumni
Association football people from Fukuoka Prefecture
Japanese footballers
J1 League players
J2 League players
Japan Football League players
Avispa Fukuoka players
Oita Trinita players
Shonan Bellmare players
Cerezo Osaka players
Matsumoto Yamaga FC players
Expatriate footballers in Singapore
Singapore Premier League players
Association football forwards